Amoria zebra, common name the zebra volute, is a species of sea snail, a marine gastropod mollusk in the family Volutidae, the volutes.

Synonyms
 Amoria (Amoria) zebra (Leach, 1814)
 Marginella radiata Lamarck, 1822
 Scaphella zebra Adams, 1864
 Voluta lineata Leach, 1814
 Voluta stragulata Megerle von Mühlfeldt, 1829
 Voluta zebra Leach, 1814 (original combination)
 Zebramoria lineatiana Weaver & du Pont, 1967

Description

The length of the shell varies between 25 mm and 55 mm. These shells are solid, glazed, with a short spire. Whorls are usually smooth and glossy. 
Columella is white and shows four strong plaits. The outer lip is thickened and smooth. The pattern of these shells is quite variable, in colour and in the density of the axial lines. The background colour varies from white to fawn or mid-brown, usually with axial brown lines.

Distribution
This marine species occurs from North Australia to New South Wales.

Habitat
These sea snails live in intertidal waters in sandy substrate, at depths of 5 to 55 m.

Bibliography
 A. G. Hinton - Guide to Australian Shells 
 Alan G. Hinton - Shells of New Guinea & Central Pacific
 Bail P. & Limpus A. (2001) The genus Amoria. In: G.T. Poppe & K. Groh (eds) A conchological iconography. Hackenheim: Conchbooks. 50 pp., 93 pls.
 Barry Wilson - Australian Marine Shells  Part 2 
 Harald Douté, M. A. Fontana Angioy - Volutes, The Doute collection

References

External links
 Encyclopedia of life
 Femorale

Volutidae
Gastropods described in 1814